The Pop's Props Zing is a single seat, open-cockpit, parasol wing, single-engine monoplane, first flown in 1996. The aircraft was designed by Scott Land and  produced by Pop's Props of Cooksville, Illinois in the form of plans and an aircraft kit. The company is no longer in business and the aircraft kit is now available from Simplex Aeroplanes of Old Saybrook, Connecticut.

The aircraft was designed for the FAR 103 Ultralight Vehicles category, including the category's  empty weight limit.

Design and development
The Zing was designed as a higher performance version of the Cloudster, with a smaller wing with a span  less than the Cloudster, yielding higher cruise speeds at the price of a higher stall speed.

The Zing is constructed of wood and covered in aircraft fabric. The landing gear is conventional with sprung aluminum main gear and a steerable tailwheel. The double surfaced wing is strut-braced with two parallel main struts and jury struts per side. The wing features 60% span ailerons and the whole wing can be removed for transport or storage.

Due to the laborious wood and fabric construction, builder completion time is estimated at 300-500 man-hours from plans or 200 man-hours from the kit. The kit is available as a single kit or as several sub-kits.

Specifications (Zing)

See also

References

External links

Photo of the Zing

1990s United States ultralight aircraft
Homebuilt aircraft
Zing
Parasol-wing aircraft
Single-engined tractor aircraft
Aircraft first flown in 1996